Ryan Broekhoff (born 23 August 1990) is an Australian professional basketball player who last played for the South East Melbourne Phoenix of the National Basketball League (NBL). He played college basketball at Valparaiso University in the United States, where he was named an All-American in 2012, and has represented Australia in several international competitions.

College career
Broekhoff, a  swingman from Frankston, Victoria, played at the prestigious Australian Institute of Sport, where he caught the attention of Valparaiso University assistant coach Chris Sparks. As a result, Broekhoff chose Valparaiso in Valparaiso, Indiana. After playing a support role in his freshman season (2009–10), Broekhoff entered the starting line-up as a sophomore, averaging 10.3 points and 5.2 rebounds per game. He led the Horizon League in three-point field goal percentage at 44.8% and placed sixth in the conference in blocked shots with 1.1 per contest.

As a junior in 2011–12, Broekhoff became one of the top players in the Horizon League. He averaged 14.8 points, 8.6 rebounds (first in the Horizon League) and 2.3 assists per game and led the Crusaders to the conference regular-season title and a National Invitation Tournament bid. At the end of the season, he was named Horizon League Player of the Year and an honourable mention All-American by the Associated Press.

In Broekhoff's final season at Valparaiso, he averaged a college-career high 15.7 points per game, while also averaging 7.3 rebounds and 2.3 assists in 32.2 minutes per game. Although he produced high numbers, he fell short in the conference MVP race to Detroit's Ray McCallum Jr. Broekhoff led his team to a 26–7 record and the top seed in the Horizon League tournament. With less than 10 seconds remaining in the semi-final game against Green Bay-Wisconsin, Valparaiso was down 2 and Broekhoff drove the ball up the court and threw up a miracle shot. While landing on his back near the scorer's table, the ball went straight through the net sending Valparaiso to the title game. The Crusaders won the title game against Wright State and clinched an NCAA Tournament berth. Valparaiso drew Michigan State for their first game and fell short 65–54. Broekhoff scored 8.

Professional career

Beşiktaş (2013–2015)
Broekhoff went undrafted in 2013 NBA draft. On 5 August 2013, Broekhoff signed a one-year deal with the option of a second with Beşiktaş Integral Forex from Turkey. In the summer of 2014, he took up the option on his contract, re-signing with Beşiktaş.

In July 2015, Broekhoff joined the Denver Nuggets for the 2015 NBA Summer League. On 24 August 2015, he parted ways with Beşiktaş.

Lokomotiv Kuban (2015–2018)
On 6 September 2015, Broekhoff signed a three-year deal with PBC Lokomotiv Kuban of the VTB United League.

Dallas Mavericks (2018–2020)
On 6 August 2018, Broekhoff signed a two-year contract with the Dallas Mavericks. He made his NBA debut on 17 October 2018, recording 3 points in four minutes, in a 100–121 loss against the Phoenix Suns. He was waived on 11 February 2020 in order to sign Michael Kidd-Gilchrist who was waived by his draft team the Charlotte Hornets on 8 February.

Philadelphia 76ers (2020)
On 27 June 2020, the Philadelphia 76ers signed Broekhoff for the remainder of the 2019–20 season. He did not play any games for the 76ers and was waived during training camp the next season.

South East Melbourne Phoenix (2021–2023)
On 15 February 2021, the South East Melbourne Phoenix signed Broekhoff for the remainder of the 2020–21 NBL season. He averaged 7.5 points, 0.6 assists and 3.5 rebounds per game.

On 28 June 2021, Broekhoff signed a two-year contract to stay with the Phoenix. He sustained a shoulder injury in March 2022 that ruled him out for four weeks.

A hip complaint kept Broekhoff out for an extended period early in the 2022–23 NBL season, and in January 2023, he suffered a groin injury that ruled him out for the rest of the regular season.

International career
Broekhoff was a member of Australia's entry in both the 2009 FIBA Under-19 World Championship in Auckland, New Zealand and the 2011 Summer Universiade in Shenzhen, China. He continued his career with the national basketball program in 2012 as he was invited to the trials for the Australia's 2012 London Olympic team. Broekhoff was one of the last cuts on the squad, making the final 14 before being released.

In 2013, Broekhoff competed in the 2013 Stanković Cup and World University Games, winning gold and silver, respectively. In August 2013, he was named in the Boomers' 2013 FIBA Oceania Championship squad to take on New Zealand in a two-game series.

Broekhoff was named in the Australian squad for the 2014 FIBA Basketball World Cup. He impressed coach Andrej Lemanis during several warm-up games and subsequently earned a place in the starting lineup during the tournament. Broekhoff returned to the Boomers' starting line-up for the two-game FIBA Oceania Championship series against New Zealand in August 2015.

Broekhoff was part of the Australian men's squad at the 2016 Rio Olympics. He opted out of the 2020 Tokyo Olympics due to mental health issues.

Career statistics

NBA

Regular season

|-
| style="text-align:left;"|
| style="text-align:left;"|Dallas
| 42 || 0 || 10.8 || .452 || .409 || .789 || 1.5 || .5 || .1 || .1 || 4.0
|-
| style="text-align:left;"|
| style="text-align:left;"|Dallas
| 17 || 1 || 10.6 || .373 || .392 || .875 || 2.5 || .6 || .3 || .2 || 4.2
|- class="sortbottom"
| style="text-align:center;" colspan="2"|Career
| 59 || 1 || 10.7 || .427 || .403 || .815 || 1.8 || .6 || .2 || .1 || 4.0

References

External links

 Valparaiso Crusaders profile
 FIBA.com profile

1990 births
Living people
2014 FIBA Basketball World Cup players
Australian expatriate basketball people in Russia
Australian expatriate basketball people in Turkey
Australian expatriate basketball people in the United States
Australian Institute of Sport basketball players
Australian men's basketball players
Basketball players at the 2016 Summer Olympics
Basketball players from Melbourne
Beşiktaş men's basketball players
Dallas Mavericks players
Medalists at the 2013 Summer Universiade
National Basketball Association players from Australia
Olympic basketball players of Australia
PBC Lokomotiv-Kuban players
Shooting guards
Small forwards
South East Melbourne Phoenix players
Undrafted National Basketball Association players
Universiade medalists in basketball
Universiade silver medalists for Australia
Valparaiso Beacons men's basketball players
People from Frankston, Victoria